The 2020 Louisville Cardinals women's soccer team represented University of Louisville during the 2020 NCAA Division I women's soccer season.  The Cardinals were led by head coach Karen Ferguson-Dayes, in her twenty-first season.  They played home games at Lynn Stadium.  This was the team's 36th season playing organized women's college soccer and their 7th playing in the Atlantic Coast Conference.

Due to the COVID-19 pandemic, the ACC played a reduced schedule in 2020 and the NCAA Tournament was postponed to 2021.  The ACC did not play a spring league schedule, but did allow teams to play non-conference games that would count toward their 2020 record in the lead up to the NCAA Tournament.

The Cardinals finished the fall season 4–5–0, 4–4–0 in ACC play to finish in a tie for sixth place.  They were awarded the sixth seed in the ACC Tournament based on tiebreakers.  In the tournament they lost to Virginia in the Quarterfinals.  The Cardinals finished the spring season 1–2–0 and were not invited to the NCAA Tournament.

Previous season 

The Cardinals finished the season 13–5–2, 5–3–2 in ACC play to finish in fourth place.  As the fourth seed in the ACC Tournament, they lost to NC State in the Quarterfinals.  They received an at-large bid to the NCAA Tournament where they defeated Lipscomb before losing to BYU in the Second Round.

Squad

Roster

Updated January 28, 2021

Team management

Source:

Schedule

Source:

|-
!colspan=6 style=""| Fall Regular Season

|-
!colspan=6 style=""| ACC Tournament

|-
!colspan=6 style=""| Spring Regular Season

2021 NWSL College Draft

Source:

Rankings

Fall 2020

Spring 2021

References

Louisville
Louisville Cardinals women's soccer seasons
2020 in sports in Kentucky